Gunnar Birkerts (January 17, 1925 – August 15, 2017) was a Latvian American architect who, for most of his career, was based in the metropolitan area of Detroit, Michigan.

Some of his notable designs include the Corning Museum of Glass and the Corning Fire Station in Corning, New York; Marquette Plaza in Minneapolis, Minnesota; the Kemper Museum of Contemporary Art in Kansas City, Missouri; and the U.S. Embassy in Caracas, Venezuela.

In 2014, the National Library of Latvia in Riga was completed to his design.

Biography

Birkerts was born and raised in Latvia, but escaped ahead of the advancing Soviet army toward the end of the Second World War. He graduated from the Technische Hochschule, Stuttgart, Germany, in 1949. He acknowledged being influenced by Scandinavian tradition and the Finnish architect Alvar Aalto.

Birkerts immigrated to the United States that year and worked initially for Perkins and Will, based in Chicago. He moved to the Detroit area in the early 1950s, where he worked for Eero Saarinen, and was chief designer for Minoru Yamasaki before opening his own office in the city's suburbs.  
Birkerts also maintained an architectural office in Wellesley, Massachusetts

He initially practiced in the partnership Birkerts and Straub. In 1963, he set up Gunnar Birkerts and Associates in Birmingham, Michigan.

The firm received Honor Awards for its projects from the (national) American Institute of Architects in 1962, 1970, 1973, as well as numerous awards from the Michigan Society of Architects and the local chapter.

Birkerts joined the faculty at the University of Michigan in 1959 and taught until 1990. The ACSA (Association of Collegiate Schools of Architecture) honored Birkerts with the ACSA Distinguished Professor Award in 1989–90.

Birkerts designed a number of notable buildings in the United States, including the Federal Reserve Bank in Minneapolis, Corning Glass Museum, the Contemporary Arts Museum Houston, the University of Iowa College of Law, the Duluth Public Library in Duluth, Minnesota, and the U.S. Embassy in Caracas, Venezuela.

In 1989 Birkerts was commissioned to design the new building for the National Library of Latvia in Riga, Latvia, which had great personal meaning for him. Also known as the Castle of Light, he drew from Latvian folklore about the Glass Mountain for its architectural form. The building was constructed over the period 2008 to 2014.

Legacy and honors

In 1970 Gunnar Birkerts was selected as a Fellow of the American Institute of Architects, and a Fellow of the Latvian Architect Association in 1971. He received numerous individual awards, including a 1971 fellowship from the Graham Foundation, the Gold Medal of the Michigan Society of Architects in 1980, the Arnold W. Brunner Memorial Prize in Architecture of the American Academy and Institute of Arts and Letters in 1981, and the 1993 Michigan Artist of the Year award. He received an honorary doctorate from Riga Technical University in 1990, the Order of the Three Stars from the Republic of Latvia in 1995 and the Great Medal of the Latvian Academy of Sciences in 2000.

Birkerts was an honorary professor at The University of Illinois and was the Architect-In-Residence at the American Academy in Rome. He also was a member of the Latvian Union of Architects, honorary member of the Latvian Academy of Sciences and a foreign member of the Riga Technical University.

Personal life
Birkerts married Sylvia, who survived him. They have three grown children, Sven Birkerts, a literary critic and professor; Andra Birkerts, an interior designer specializing in residential work; and Erik Birkerts.

Birkerts died at the age of 92 on August 15, 2017, in Needham, Massachusetts, of congestive heart failure.

Architectural work

Perkins+Will
Rockford Memorial Hospital, Rockford, Illinois 1950

Eero Saarinen
 GM Tech Center, Warren, Michigan 1950–1955
Milwaukee County War Memorial Building, Milwaukee, Wisconsin 1950–1955
Kresge Auditorium at MIT, Cambridge, Massachusetts 1953
Concordia Senior College, Fort Wayne, Indiana 1953
Irwin Union Bank and Trust, Columbus, Indiana 1954

Minoru Yamasaki
Lambert-St. Louis International Airport Main Terminal, St. Louis, Missouri 1956
Reynolds Metals Regional Sales Office, Southfield, Michigan 1959

Personal Work
 Cultural Center, Leopoldville, Belgian Congo, 1958
 Technical University, Ankara, Turkey 1959

Work Done while Faculty at The University of Michigan (Birkerts & Straub, Birkerts & Associates)
 Schwartz Summer Residence, Northville, Michigan 1960
 1300 Lafayette East Apartments, Detroit, Michigan 1961–1963
 Lillibridge Elementary School, Detroit, Michigan 1962–1963
 People's Federal Savings and Loan Branch, Royal Oak, Michigan 1962–1963
 Marathon Oil Office Building, Detroit, Michigan 1962–1964
 University Reformed Church, Ann Arbor, Michigan 1963–1964
 Detroit Institute of the Arts Master Plan and South Wing, Detroit, Michigan 1964
 Bald Mountain Recreation Facility, Lake Orion, Michigan 1964–1968
 Fisher Administrative Center at the University of Detroit-Mercy, Detroit, Michigan 1964–1966
 Travis Residence, Franklin, Michigan 1964–1965
Tougaloo College Master Plan, Tougaloo, Mississippi 1965
 Tougaloo College Library and Dormitories, Tougaloo, Mississippi 1965–1972
 Lincoln Elementary School, Columbus, Indiana 1965–1967
 Freeman Residence, Grand Rapids, Michigan 1965–1966
 Massey Ferguson North American Operations Offices Project, Des Moines, Iowa Unbuilt, 1966
 Vocational Technical Institute Master Plan, Carbondale, Illinois Unbuilt, 1967
 Alfred Noble Branch Library, Livonia, Michigan, 1967
 Ford Pavilion at Hemisfair 1968, San Antonio, Texas 1967–1968
 Federal Reserve Bank of Minneapolis, Minneapolis, Minnesota 1967–1973
 Amsterdam City Hall Project, Amsterdam, Netherlands 1968
 Corning Public Library Project, Corning, New York Unbuilt, 1969
 Corning Public Library II Project, Corning, New York Unbuilt, 1969
 Duluth Public Library, Duluth, Minnesota 1969–1979
 IBM Corporate Computer Center, Sterling Forest, New York 1970–1972
 Contemporary Arts Museum, Houston, Texas 1970–1972
 Ford Visitors Reception Center, Dearborn, Michigan Unbuilt, 1971
 Dance Instructional Facility for SUNY Purchase, Purchase, New York 1971–1976
 General Motors Dual-Mode Transportation Study 1973–1974
 Corning Municipal Fire Station, Corning, New York 1973–1974
 Subterranean Urban-Systems Study, Graham Foundation Grant, 1974
 Calvary Baptist Church, Detroit, Michigan 1974–1977
 IBM Office Building, Southfield, Michigan 1974–1979
 University of Michigan Law Library Addition, Ann Arbor, Michigan 1974–1981
 United States Embassy, Helsinki, Finland Unbuilt, 1975
 Corning Museum of Glass, Corning, New York 1976–1980
 University of Iowa College of Law Building, Iowa City, Iowa 1979–1986
 Cathedral of the Most Blessed Sacrament Renovations, Detroit, Michigan Unbuilt Scheme, 1980
 Ferguson Residence (Villa Ginny), Kalamazoo, Michigan 1980–1983
 Uris Library Addition at Cornell University, Ithaca, New York 1980–1983
 St. Peter's Lutheran Church, Columbus, Indiana 1980–1988
 Anchorage Library, Anchorage, Alaska Unbuilt, 1981
 Baldwin Public Library Addition, Birmingham, Michigan 1981
 Minnesota State Capitol Expansion Project, St. Paul, Minnesota Unbuilt, 1983
 Holtzman and Silverman Office Building, Southfield, Michigan 1983–1989
 Minnesota History Center, Minneapolis, Minnesota Unbuilt, 1984
 Bardha Residence, Birmingham, Michigan 1984–1989
 Domino's Pizza Corporate Headquarters (Domino's Farms), Ann Arbor, Michigan 1984–1998
 Oberlin College Conservatory of Music Library Addition, Oberlin, Ohio 1986–1988
 Schembechler Hall for the University of Michigan, Ann Arbor, Michigan 1986–1990
 Papal Altar and Furniture, Pontiac, Michigan 1987 (Now housed at the Cathedral of the Most Blessed Sacrament, Detroit)
 Novoli I, Florence, Italy Unbuilt, 1987
 Domino's Tower, Ann Arbor, Michigan Unbuilt, 1987–1988
 UC-San Diego Library Addition, San Diego, California 1987–1993
 Ohio State University Law School Addition, Columbus, Ohio 1988–1993
 Church of the Servant, Kentwood, Michigan 1988–1994
 Torino I, Turin, Italy Unbuilt, 1989
 Torino II, Turin, Italy Unbuilt, 1989–1990
 Marge Monaghan House, Drummond Island, Michigan 1989–1990
 Sports and Civic Stadium, Venice, Italy Unbuilt, 1989–1992
 United States Embassy, Caracas, Venezuela 1989–1996
 National Library of Latvia, Riga, Latvia 1989–2014

Professor Emeritus at the University of Michigan
 Grasis Residence, Vail, Colorado 1990–1994
 Kemper Museum of Contemporary Art, Kansas City, Missouri 1991–1994
 Marriott Library Addition at the University of Utah, Salt Lake City, Utah 1992–1996
 Novoli II, Florence, Italy Unbuilt, 1993
 Juma Al-Majid Center for Culture and Heritage, Dubai, United Arab Emirates Unbuilt, 1993
 Riga Central Market Restoration and Expansion, Riga, Latvia Unbuilt, 1995
 Cellular Communications Tower at Domino's Farms, Ann Arbor, Michigan 1995
 Cathedral of the Most Blessed Sacrament, Detroit, Michigan 1998–2003
 Dr. Martin Luther King Jr. Public Library, San Jose, California 1998–2004
 Kellogg Library at California State-San Marcos, San Marcos, California 2000–2004
 The Museum of the Occupation of Latvia, Riga, Latvia 2002–

Publications

Birkerts, Gunnar, Gunnar Birkerts – Metaphoric Modernist, Axel Menges, Stuttgart, Germany 2009; 
Birkerts, Gunnar, Process and Expression in Architectural Form, University of Oklahoma Press, Norman OK 1994;  
Birkerts, Gunnar, Subterranean Urban Systems, Industrial Development Division-Institute of Science and Technology, University of Michigan 1974
Kaiser, Kay, The Architecture of Gunnar Birkerts, American Institute of Architects Press, Washington DC 1989;  
Martin, William, Gunnar Birkerts and Associates (Yukio Futagawa, editor and photographer), A.D.A. Edita (GA Architect), Tokyo 1982
Gunnar Birkerts & Associates, IBM Information Systems Center, Sterling Forest, N.Y., 1972; Federal Reserve Bank of Minneapolis, Minnesota, 1973 (Yukio Futagawa, editor and photographer), A.D.A. EDITA (GA Architecture), Tokyo 1974

References

External links

Gunnar Birkerts Architects, Inc.
"Gunnar Birkerts papers 1930–2002", at the Bentley Historical Library, University of Michigan
Biography  

Modernist architects
1925 births
2017 deaths
Architects from Detroit
Architects from Massachusetts
Fellows of the American Institute of Architects
Taubman College of Architecture and Urban Planning faculty
People associated with the Detroit Institute of Arts
Architects from Riga
Soviet emigrants to the United States
Latvian World War II refugees
20th-century American architects
Riga State Gymnasium No.1 alumni
21st-century American architects